The 1979–80 Minnesota North Stars season was the 13th season in North Stars history. The previous year's merger with the Cleveland Barons began to pay off as the North Stars finished with a winning record for the first time in seven years, and finished in third place in the Adams Division with 88 points. Former Baron Al MacAdam led the team in scoring with 93 points and captured the Bill Masterton Trophy. In the playoffs, the North Stars swept the Toronto Maple Leafs in three games in the preliminary round. In the quarterfinals, they shocked the hockey world by eliminating the 4-time Stanley Cup champion Montreal Canadiens in seven games. The upset earned the North Stars a trip to the semi-finals, where their cinderella run came to an end when they fell in five games to the Philadelphia Flyers.

Offseason

NHL Draft

Regular season

Final standings

Schedule and results

Transactions

Trades

Player statistics

Skaters

Note: GP = Games played; G = Goals; A = Assists; Pts = Points; +/- = Plus/minus; PIM = Penalty minutes

Goaltenders
Note: GP = Games played; TOI = Time on ice (minutes); W = Wins; L = Losses; OT = Overtime losses; GA = Goals against; SO = Shutouts; SV% = Save percentage; GAA = Goals against average

Playoffs
NHL 1st Round
4/8/1980 Toronto Maple Leafs 6 - 3 (Stars lead 1 - 0)
4/9/1980 Toronto Maple Leafs 7 - 2 (Stars lead 2 - 0)
4/11/1980 at Toronto Maple Leafs 4 - 3 (Stars win 3 - 0)
NHL Quarter-finals
4/16/1980 at Montreal Canadiens 3 - 0 (Stars lead 1 - 0)
4/17/1980 at Montreal Canadiens 4 - 1 (Stars lead 2 - 0)
4/19/1980 Montreal Canadiens 0 - 5 (Stars lead 2 - 1)
4/20/1980 Montreal Canadiens 1 - 5 (Series tied 2 - 2)
4/22/1980 at Montreal Canadiens 2 - 6 (Canadiens lead 3 - 2)
4/24/1980 Montreal Canadiens 5 - 2 (Series tied 3 - 3)
4/27/1980 at Montreal Canadiens 3 - 2 (Stars win 4 - 3)
Series winning goal scored by Al MacAdam.
NHL Semi-finals
4/29/1980 at Philadelphia Flyers 6 - 5 (Stars lead 1 - 0)
5/1/1980 at Philadelphia Flyers 0 - 7 (Series tied 1 - 1)
5/4/1980 Philadelphia Flyers 3 - 5 (Flyers lead 2 - 1)
5/6/1980 Philadelphia Flyers 2 - 3 (Flyers lead 3 - 1)
5/8/1980 at Philadelphia Flyers 3 - 7 (Flyers win 4 - 1)

Awards and records
Bill Masterton Memorial Trophy: || Al MacAdam, Minnesota North Stars

References
 North Stars on Hockey Database

Minnesota North Stars seasons
Minnesota North Stars
Minnesota North Stars
Minnesota North Stars
Minnesota Twins Minnesota